Stanislav Vladimirovich Lebedintsev (born 18 March 1978) is a former Russian professional footballer.

Club career
He played 3 seasons in the Russian Football National League for FC SKA Rostov-on-Don.

References

External links
 

1978 births
Sportspeople from Ashgabat
Living people
Turkmenistan footballers
Russian footballers
Association football midfielders
FC Dynamo Saint Petersburg players
FC Lada-Tolyatti players
FC Nika Krasny Sulin players
FC SKA Rostov-on-Don players
Kazakhstan Premier League players
Russian expatriate footballers
Expatriate footballers in Belgium
Expatriate footballers in Kazakhstan
Russian expatriate sportspeople in Kazakhstan